Ogres Vēstis (News of the Ogre) is a regional newspaper published in Ogre, Latvia.

External links
Official website 

Mass media in Ogre, Latvia
Newspapers published in Latvia